The Ministry of Civil Service was a governmental body in Saudi Arabia that is responsible for arranging the affairs of public employees. It was founded by a royal decree in 1999 to replace the General Bureau of Civil Service and Dr Muhammad bin Ali Al-Fayez served as its first minister. In February 2020, the Ministry was merged with Ministry of Labour and Social Development into a new ministry called Ministry of Human Resources and Social Development.

Its Functions 
The ministry’s main functions are:

 to plan the civil manpower as required by the government
 to guarantee that the civil servants’ competencies match the government’s requirements
 to recommend systems of civil service
 to improve the civil service
 to develop rules and regulations that keep the government employees’ records
 to collaborate with HR departments in different governmental entities

References 
 

Civil
1990s establishments in Saudi Arabia